Indre Sula Church is a parish church of the Church of Norway in Sula Municipality in Møre og Romsdal county, Norway. It is located in the village of Mauseidvåg on the island of Sula. It is one of the two churches for the Sula parish which is part of the Nordre Sunnmøre prosti (deanery) in the Diocese of Møre. The gray, wooden church was built in a cruciform design in 1984 using plans drawn up by the architect Aksel Fronth. The church seats about 290 people.

See also
List of churches in Møre

References

Sula, Møre og Romsdal
Churches in Møre og Romsdal
Wooden churches in Norway
Cruciform churches in Norway
20th-century Church of Norway church buildings
Churches completed in 1984
1984 establishments in Norway